HGU may refer to:

 Hangu railway station, in Pakistan
 Herguan University, in Sunnyvale, California, United States
 Mount Hagen Airport in Papua New Guinea
 MRC Human Genetics Unit, at the Western General Hospital in Edinburgh, Scotland
 School of Business, Economics and Law, at the University of Gothenburg